The Cat Came Back is a 1936 Warner Bros. Merrie Melodies cartoon directed by Friz Freleng. The short was released on February 8, 1936.

Plot
A curious kitten leaves her family to play with an equally curious little mouse from across the hall, despite both being told by their mothers how bad the other's family is. Mama Mouse warns her kids to stay away from cats, while Mama Cat tells her kids to attack all mice. The kitten and mouse sneak out of their lessons and listen to some records together as an excuse to get in some hot 1930s tunes and dance around. While dancing, they accidentally fall down a drain into the sewer. The little kitten is saved by the little mouse. The two mothers get together to rejoice, but old feuds are not so easily forgotten, and the cat and mice families start to fight again.

Home media
LaserDisc - The Golden Age of Looney Tunes, Volume 5, Side 5, Pesky Pets (USA 1995 Turner print)

References

External links

1936 films
1936 comedy films
Animated films without speech
Films scored by Norman Spencer (composer)
Short films directed by Friz Freleng
Merrie Melodies short films
Warner Bros. Cartoons animated short films
1936 animated films
Animated films about mice
Animated films about cats
1930s Warner Bros. animated short films